The Divisiones Regionales de Fútbol in the Community of Castile and León:
Primera División Regional Aficionados (Level 6)
Primera División Provincial Aficionados (Level 7)
Segunda División Provincial Aficionados (Level 8)
Tercera División Provincial Aficionados (Level 9)

League chronology
Timeline - Ávila

Timeline - Burgos

Timeline - León

Timeline - Palencia

Timeline - Salamanca

Timeline - Segovia

Timeline - Soria

Timeline - Valladolid

Timeline - Zamora

Primera Regional

Primera Regional is the sixth level of competition of the Spanish Football League in the Community of Castile and León.

The league 
The Primera División Regional is played in two groups of 18 teams. At the end of the season, the champion of each group and the best runner-up are promoted. Bottom four teams from Group A and bottom three from Group B are relegated to Primera División Provincial Aficionado. Further teams may be relegated to maintain a league of 36 teams.

2022–23 teams

Group A

Group B

Primera Provincial

Primera Provincial is the seventh level of competition of the Spanish Football League in the Community of Castilla y León.

The League
The Primera División Provincial comprises nine groups (one from each province) from 14 to 18 teams. The nine provincial champions are promoted to Primera División Regional. There are relegations to Segunda Provincial de Aficionados in four provinces; Ávila, Segovia (3 clubs), León (2 clubs) and Valladolid (3 clubs).

2022–23 teams

Group Ávila

Group Burgos

Group León

Group Palencia

Group Salamanca

Group Segovia

Group Soria

Group Valladolid

Group Zamora

Segunda Provincial

The League
The Segunda Provincial is played in four provinces (Ávila, León, Segovia and Valladolid) in four groups from 7 to 16 teams. The group winner from Ávila, the two top clubs from León and the three top clubs from Segovia and Valladolid are promoted to Primera División Provincial Aficionado.

2022–23 teams

Group Ávila

Group León

Group Segovia

Group Valladolid

Tercera Provincial

The League
The Tercera Provincial is played in the province of Valladolid in one group of 22 teams. The three top clubs are promoted to Segunda División Provincial Aficionado.

Group Valladolid

Subgroup 1

Subgroup 2

External links
Federación de Castilla y León de Fútbol
Fútbolme

Divisiones Regionales de Fútbol
Football in Castile and León
Sports competitions in Castile and León